James McClymont Dobbin (July 8, 1927 - October 13, 2015) was a Canadian football player who played for the Calgary Stampeders. He won the Grey Cup with them in 1948. Dobbin played junior football in Calgary for the North Hill Blizzard.

References

1927 births
2015 deaths
Canadian football running backs
Calgary Stampeders players